Dortmund-Kley station is in the district of Kley of the city of Dortmund in the German state of North Rhine-Westphalia. It was built on a loop line (line 2190) off the Witten/Dortmund–Oberhausen/Duisburg railway, which was opened on 24 September 1983 from Bochum-Langendreer to Dortmund-Dorstfeld. The station was opened on 24 September 1983 and it is classified by Deutsche Bahn as a category 5 station.

The station is served by line S 1 of the Rhine-Ruhr S-Bahn (Dortmund–Solingen) on week days every 15 minutes during the day between Dortmund and Essen.

In addition, the station is served by buses on line 470, operated by DSW21 at twenty-minute intervals.

Notes

Rhine-Ruhr S-Bahn stations
S1 (Rhine-Ruhr S-Bahn)
Railway stations in Dortmund
Railway stations in Germany opened in 1983
1983 establishments in West Germany